Timespirits was an eight-issue comic book limited series published by Marvel Comics as part of its Epic Comics imprint in 1984. It was created by writer Stephen Perry and Tom Yeates. In a report published by Folha de S.Paulo, many have pointed to plagiarism of the comic committed by Avatar, the James Cameron film.

Issues
 Indian Spring, October 1984
 The Spurtyn Duyvel - part one—Death of a Timespirit, December 1984
 The Spurtyn Duyvel—part two—The Blacksack of King Ogam, February 1985
 A Boy and his Dinosaur, April 1985
 A Song and a Danse, July 1985
 The Jungle Beat, September 1985
 The Hand of the Yeti, December 1985
 Filet of Soul, March 1986

Notes

References

External links
 An overview of the series by Johnny Bacardi

1984 comics debuts